is a Japanese professional shogi player ranked 7-dan. He is currently serving as an executive director of the Japan Shogi Association.

Nishio introduces shogi theory in the English language through his blog Shogi Openings and his occasional posts on Facebook.

Early life
Nishio was born in Yokohama, Kanagawa Prefecture on September 30, 1979.

In September 1990, Nishio entered the Japan Shogi Association's apprentice school at the rank of 6-kyū under the guidance of shogi professional Teruichi Aono. He was promoted to the rank of 1-dan in 1995, and obtained full professional status and the rank of 4-dan in April 2003 after finishing runner up in the 32nd 3-dan League with a record of 11 wins and 7 losses.

Shogi professional

Promotion history
Nishio's promotion history is as follows:

 6-kyū: September 1990
 1-dan: 1995
 4-dan: April 1, 2003
 5-dan: September 18, 2007
 6-dan: April 21, 2011
 7-dan: February 13, 2019

JSA director
Nishio was elected to the Japan Shogi Association's board of directors for a two-year term as an executive director in June 2019 and then again in June 2021.

Bibliography
西尾 [Nishio], 明 [Akira]. 2011. よくわかる角換わり. 毎日コミュニケーションズ. 
西尾, 明. 2015. 矢倉☖5三銀右戦法: 仕掛けて勝つ後手矢倉の革命. マイナビ出版. 
西尾, 明. 2017. 矢倉の基本: 駒組みと考え方. マイナビ出版. 
西尾, 明; 大平 [Ōhira], 武洋 [Takehiro]; & 村中 [Muranaka], 秀史 [Shūji]. 2008. 新鋭居飛車実戦集. 毎日コミュニケーションズ.

References

External links
English language blog: Shogi Openings
ShogiHub: Professional Player Info · Nishio, Akira
 

Japanese shogi players
Living people
Professional shogi players
People from Yokohama
Professional shogi players from Kanagawa Prefecture
1979 births